Victor Hugh Buchanan (27 February 1899 – 27 May 1966) was an Australian rules footballer who played a single game with Geelong in the Victorian Football League (VFL) in 1921.

Notes

External links 

1899 births
1966 deaths
Australian rules footballers from Victoria (Australia)
Geelong Football Club players
Barwon Football Club players
Australian military personnel of World War I